Yttrium oxide, also known as yttria, is Y2O3. It is an air-stable, white solid substance.

The thermal conductivity of yttrium oxide is 27 W/(m·K).

Uses

Phosphors
Yttria is widely used to make Eu:YVO4 and Eu:Y2O3 phosphors that give the red color in color TV picture tubes.

Yttria lasers
Y2O3 is a prospective solid-state laser material. In particular, lasers with ytterbium as dopant allow the efficient operation both in continuous operation
and in pulsed regimes.
At high concentration of excitations (of order of 1%) and poor cooling, the quenching of emission at laser frequency and avalanche broadband emission takes place. (Yttria-based lasers are not to be confused with YAG lasers using yttrium aluminum garnet, a widely used crystal host for rare earth laser dopants).

Gas Lighting
The original use of the mineral yttria and the purpose of its extraction from mineral sources was as part of the process of making gas mantles and other products for turning the flames of artificially-produced gases (initially hydrogen, later coal gas, paraffin, or other products) into human-visible light. This use is almost obsolete - thorium and cerium oxides are larger components of such products these days.

Dental ceramics
Yttrium oxide is used to stabilize the Zirconia in late-generation porcelain-free metal-free dental ceramics. This is a very hard ceramic used as a strong base material in some full ceramic restorations.  The zirconia used in dentistry is zirconium oxide which has been stabilized with the addition of yttrium oxide.  The full name of zirconia used in dentistry is "yttria-stabilized zirconia" or YSZ.

Microwave filters
Yttrium oxide is also used to make yttrium iron garnets, which are very effective microwave filters.

Superconductors
Y2O3 is used to make the high temperature superconductor YBa2Cu3O7, known as "1-2-3" to indicate the ratio of the metal constituents:

 2 Y2O3 + 8 BaO + 12 CuO + O2 → 4 YBa2Cu3O7
This synthesis is typically conducted at 800 °C.

Inorganic synthesis
Yttrium oxide is an important starting point for inorganic compounds. For organometallic chemistry it is converted to YCl3 in a reaction with concentrated hydrochloric acid and ammonium chloride.

Natural occurrence
Yttriaite-(Y), approved as a new mineral species in 2010, is the natural form of yttria. It is exceedingly rare, occurring as inclusions in native tungsten particles in a placer deposit of the Bol’shaja Pol’ja river, Prepolar Ural, Siberia. As a chemical component of other minerals, the oxide yttria was first isolated in 1789 by Johan Gadolin, from rare-earth minerals in a mine at the Swedish town of Ytterby, near Stockholm.

See also
 Yttralox

References

External links
Yttrium oxide information at Webelements.

Yttrium compounds
Sesquioxides
Transition metal oxides